Chappie Sheppell was an American soccer forward who led the American Soccer League in scoring in 1943.

Sheppell began playing professionally in the American Soccer League in 1934 for the Kearny Scots.  In 1942, he finished fifth in the scoring table with twelve goals in seventeen games while playing for the Kearny Irish.  In 1943, he topped the charts with twelve goals and fourteen assists in fifteen games.  In 1950, the Irish finished runner-up to the Philadelphia Nationals.  Sheppell retired at the end of the season.

References

Living people
American soccer players
American Soccer League (1933–1983) players
Kearny Scots players
Kearny Irish players
Association football forwards
Year of birth missing (living people)